Ivan Mráz (born 24 May 1941) is a Czechoslovak former football player who competed in the 1964 Summer Olympics and won the silver medal. Scored five goals in that Olympics Football Tournament. Besides Czechoslovakia, he has played in the Netherlands.

Managerial career
Remembered as Liga Deportiva Alajuelense's manager and trainer team where he won two Costa Rican national titles in 1980 and 1991. In 1980 was the trainer of National Team of Costa Rica.

In December 2010, Mráz was appointed as manager of CF Universidad de Costa Rica.

References

External links
 
 
 
 
 
 

1941 births
Living people
Czechoslovak footballers
Czechoslovak football managers
Olympic footballers of Czechoslovakia
Olympic silver medalists for Czechoslovakia
Olympic medalists in football
Footballers at the 1964 Summer Olympics
Medalists at the 1964 Summer Olympics
ŠK Slovan Bratislava players
AC Sparta Prague players
Dukla Prague footballers
MVV Maastricht players
AC Sparta Prague managers
L.D. Alajuelense managers
Expatriate football managers in Costa Rica
Association football forwards
People from Levoča
Sportspeople from the Prešov Region
Czechoslovakia international footballers
Czechoslovakia youth international footballers
Slovak expatriate football managers